Roman Volodymyrovych Tkach (born 22 May 1962, in Yamnytsia, Ivano-Frankivsk Raion, Ukraine) is a Ukrainian politician. In 2005 to 2007, he was a leading figure in a political life of Prykarpattia.

Tkach was born near Ivano-Frankivsk. In 1992-2002 he a local political figure in Tysmenytsia Raion.

With some breaks between 2002-2012 Tkach was a People's Deputy of Ukraine. In 2005-2007 he served as a head of the Ivano-Frankivsk Oblast State Administration (Governor of Prykarpattia). In 2007 Tkach was a member of the National Security and Defense Council of Ukraine.

References

External links
 Profile at the Official Ukraine Today portal

1962 births
Living people
People from Ivano-Frankivsk Oblast
People's Movement of Ukraine politicians
All-Ukrainian Union "Fatherland" politicians
Petro Poroshenko Bloc politicians
Governors of Ivano-Frankivsk Oblast
Sixth convocation members of the Verkhovna Rada
Fourth convocation members of the Verkhovna Rada